Progress in Optics are a series of books edited by Emil Wolf published by Elsevier. They consist of collections of already published review articles deemed to be representative of the advances made in the fields of optics.

The series was established in 1962.

External links 
 

Publications established in 1962
Physics books
Series of books
Elsevier books